Sforza Secondo Sforza (1433 - 1492/1493) was an Italian condottiero.

Life
Born in Grottammare, he was the illegitimate son of Francesco Sforza by his lover Giovanna d'Acquapendente. In 1451 he married Antonia Dal Verme (?–1487) and to mark the occasion Sforza's father granted him the county of Borgonovo. He and Tiberto Brandolini tried to come to the assistance of Giovanni d'Angiò in his battle against the kingdom of Aragon, but in 1461 Sforza was captured and was only freed thanks to his wife's petition. He only had one legitimate child by her, Giovanna, who died in 1453.

He was reinstated in his lands by Ludovico il Moro, who put him in charge of the war against the Republic of Genoa, which had rebelled against the Adorno family. However, Sforza was defeated and in 1482 he was sent to invade the territories of the county of San Secondo and besiege the Rocca dei Rossi during the Rossi War, forcing Pier Maria II de' Rossi to flee to his castle at Torrechiara. In 1483 he was promoted to captain general and fought against Parma, which had attempted to rebel against the Sforzas, and the following year he was made governor of Piacenza. When il Moro fell, Sforza Secondo fled to Naples, where he probably died between 1492 and 1493.

Illegitimate issue
 Jacopetto, later legitimated
 Lucrezia, married  Antonio Anguissola
 Francesco (?–1491), later legitimated, married Franceschina Borromeo
 Polissena
 Leone, later legitimated

References

15th-century condottieri
1433 births
1493 deaths
Illegitimate children of Italian monarchs
Sforza Secondo
Counts of Italy